Television in Spain was introduced in 1956, when the national state-owned public service television broadcaster Televisión Española (TVE) started regular analog free-to-air terrestrial black and white broadcasts. Colour transmissions started in 1972 after two years of test transmissions, with all programming transmitted in color in 1977, and colour commercials starting in 1978. TVE held a monopoly on television broadcasting until regional public channels were launched during the 1980s and commercial television started nationwide in 1990. Digital terrestrial television was launched on 30 November 2005 with analog service discontinued on 3 April 2010. Currently, television is one of the leading mass media of the country, and by 2008 was in 99.7% of households in Spain according to INE statistics.

Until recently terrestrial television was considered an essential public service. Broadcasting is managed both directly by the State and indirectly, through controlled concessions to private companies. The Audiovisual Law of 2010 changed this by defining radio and television as commercial services that individuals pay for, fostering liberalization within some constraints.

History 
Analog free-to-air terrestrial black and white television began on 28 October 1956 in Spain. Televisión Española (now La 1) was the very first regular television channel, and operated alone until 15 November 1966, when TVE launched a second channel (now La 2). TVE started regular colour transmissions in 1972 after two years of test transmissions, with all programming transmitted in color in 1977, and colour commercials starting in 1978. They were the only authorized television channels in Spain, as TVE held a monopoly on television broadcasting, until the first regional public television channel was launched on 16 February 1983, when Euskal Telebista started broadcasting in the Basque Country. It was followed on 11 September 1983 by TV3 in Catalonia, on 24 July 1985 by Televisión de Galicia (TVG) in Galicia, on 28 February 1989 by Canal Sur in Andalusia, on 2 May 1989 by Telemadrid in Madrid and on 9 October 1989 by Canal Nou in the Valencian Community. The full liberalization of television with the law of 1989 permitted the establishment of private commercial channels.

Commercial television was launched on 25 January 1990, when Antena 3 started broadcasting nationwide. It was followed by Telecinco on 3 March 1990 and Canal+ on 14 September 1990. Both Antena 3 and Telecinco were free-to-air analog terrestrial channels while Canal+ was a pay analog terrestrial channel obliged to broadcast six free-to-air hours a day. Sogecable's pay analog satellite multichannel television provider Canal Satélite was launched on 1 January 1994. Two pay digital satellite multichannel television providers were launched in 1997, Canal Satélite Digital on 31 January (controlled by PRISA) and Vía Digital on 15 September (controlled by Telefónica, TVE Temática, Televisa and minority shareholders), only to merge six years later, on 21 July 2003, to form Digital+, renamed to Canal+ on 17 October 2011 after its flagship channel.

Through the 1990s and 2000s, more regional channels (most of them public, but some of them private) were launched. A number of them created FORTA, a union of public regional broadcasters. Many local channels were also launched, some of them created the Localia Network. During the 1990s, dozens of local channels started broadcasting without a license. The government declared that channels that proved to be operating for a long time could go on working, but blocked new unlicensed channels.

On 3 April 2010 the analog service was officially discontinued.

Digital terrestrial television

TDT Transition 
In the 2000s, the analog national and autonomic channels started simulcast on digital terrestrial television. In 2005, Canal+ stopped its analog service to move to Digital Plus and was substituted by Cuatro. Some weeks later, the last analog national private channel, La Sexta, started testing broadcasts, to begin its regular analog schedule in 2006. In 2009, the analog service started its closure in a process that lasted one year.
The development of digital terrestrial television was very similar to the failure of ITV Digital in the United Kingdom. Digital terrestrial television was introduced in the country by the pay per view platform Quiero Television. In May 2002, statewide operators were required to start broadcasting in DVB-T. Yet, Quiero TV ceased transmissions in 2002 after a commercial failure. Unlike the UK, the three and half multiplexes left by the platform were not reassigned to other operators, and so 5 channels were squashed into a single multiplex.

On 30 November 2005, digital terrestrial television was relaunched as a free service with 20 channels and 14 radio stations, along with 23 regional- and local-language channels in their respective areas. Currently about 95% of the population can receive DTT. Each multiplex has a minimum of 4 SD channels each or one HD channel. Televisió de Catalunya and Aragón Televisión are using spare bandwidth in their own digital multiplex to broadcast test HD streams.

Modern free-to-air digital terrestrial television sector 
Analog service was discontinued in April 2010. Since then, all national and regional terrestrial channels are digital. Together with the TDT transition and the process of absorption of channels in the late-2000s to early-2010s amid the Spanish financial crisis, the removal of commercials from RTVE by means of its 2009 Funding Law facilitated the creation of the duopoly formed by Mediaset España and Atresmedia, that secures a 57% share of the audience and a 90% 
of advertising procurement.

Television Española 

La 1 ("La Uno"): Spain's principal public-service television network, publicly owned and financed and offering programming aimed at a wide public. Previous names include La Primera Cadena and TVE-1. La 2 ("La Dos"): the country's second nationwide public channel, providing alternative programming to La 1. Previous names include UHF, La Segunda Cadena and TVE-2.

Atresmedia 

As of 2020, Atresmedia is the second largest free-to-air television network in terms of audience. It is owned by the Grupo Planeta. It traces its origins to those of its flagship channel, Antena 3: one of the nationwide private television networks that received a broadcasting licence in 1989. Antena 3 airs general programs such as news, movies, reality shows, sport events and quizzes. 

The network's secondary generalist channel, laSexta, traces its origins to the granting of another private license in 2005. It was then jointly owned by the Mexican giant Televisa (40%) and the Grupo Audiovisual de Medios de Producción (60%), which was in turn participated by Grupo Árbol-Globomedia (40%), Mediapro (38%), Drive (10%), El Terrat (7%) and Bainet (5%).

However in the context of mergings in the late-2000 to early-2010s, the channels of Antena 3 and those of Mediapro merged in 2011, and LaSexta subsequently became part of the newly created Grupo Atresmedia.

Mediaset España 

As of 2020, Mediaset España is the television group with the largest audience. It has its origins in the Gestevisión Telecinco, the society created in 1989 that was granted one of the first licenses for private free-to-air analogic terrestrial TV private channels in Spain: Tele 5 (later branded as Telecinco). It was initially formed by Italian media tycoon Silvio Berlusconi's Fininvest (25%), Grupo Anaya (25%), ONCE (25%) and other shareholders (25%), although the share distribution has changed over the years, and, as of 2020, Mediaset España is owned via Mediaset Italia by the Berlusconi family, and, in 2019, the group simply attempted to merge with Mediaset Italia.

In 2011, the media conglomerate was renamed to Mediaset España Comunicación S.A. PRISA eventually sold its remaining shares in 2015.

The flagship channel of the network remains Telecinco. Telecinco airs general programs such as news, movies, reality shows, sport events and quizzes. As secondary channel in the Mediaset network, Cuatro airs general programs such as news, movies, documentaries, reality shows, sport events and quizzes.

Regional broadcasters 
Many of the Spanish regions (comunidades autónomas) have their own public network service: Telemadrid in the Madrid region, Canal Extremadura Televisión in Extremadura, 7RM in the Region of Murcia, Canal Sur in Andalusia, CMM TV in Castilla–La Mancha, TVG Televisión de Galicia, TV3 in Catalonia, À Punt in the Valencian Community, EITB Euskal Telebista in Basque Country, TPA in Asturias, TV Canaria in Canary Islands, etc. Most of these channels (called "las autonómicas") are integrated in the FORTA ("Federación de Organismos de Radio Televisión Autonómicos").

Among the flagship channels of the different autonomous communities, the Catalan TV3 stands out because it enjoys, by far, the largest share of audience in its respective region, leading, in fact, over the rest of terrestrial channels with a 14.6% share of audience in Catalonia in 2019.

Other terrestrial television channels

By autonomous community

 Andalusia
 Aragon
 Asturias
 Balearic Islands
 Basque Country

 Canary Islands
 Cantabria
 Castile and León
 Castilla–La Mancha

 Catalonia
 Ceuta
 Extremadura
 Galicia
 La Rioja

 Madrid
 Region of Murcia
 Melilla
 Navarre
 Valencian Community

Most-viewed channels
Monthly viewing shares in December 2021 (Top 10 individual channels):

Discontinued channels

 TVE 50 Años
 Canal Clásico
 Canal Nostalgia
 Cultural·es
 Telecinco Estrellas
 Telecinco Sport
 Net TV
 Fly Music
 Telehit
 Hogar 10
 Sony TV en Veo
 40 Latino
 La Tienda en Casa
 CNN+
 GH24
 Veo7
 La 10
 Nou (HD)
 Nou 2
 Nou 24
 TVE HD
 Marca TV
 MTV
 Intereconomía
 AXN
 Nitro
 Xplora
 laSexta2
 laSexta3
 LaSiete
 Nueve

Cable
Digital cable is slowly replacing the aging analog service of the major cable provider Ono. Telecable, a cable ISP operating in Asturias has begun trials for 1000 mega bytes per second service and is the first to broadcast HD channels. 
R, a cable operator in Galicia, has completely switched pay TV to digital (DVB-C) by 2008 but free channels are simulcast as analog services, so users without a set-top box can watch them (including most free-to-air channels available on digital terrestrial TV in each location).

Satellite

Digital satellite services has existed since 1997 from Astra and Hispasat satellites. The Movistar+ pay platform has carried some HDTV tests on Astra 19.2°E on 16 June 2005. This platform (before Canal+) has a lot of exclusives channels as "#0" by February 2016 without having to pay the licence of the brand Canal+.

A high definition version of Canal+ 1 (Canal+ 1 HD) now is called "#0"; started on 29 January 2008, together with HD versions of Canal+ Deportes (now Movistar Deportes) and Canal+ DCine (now Movistar Drama) broadcast from Astra 1KR.

IPTV

During 2007 Telefónica ran trials of VDSL services up to 52 Mbit/s - However, the results were not as good as expected. For this reason, Telefónica will use FTTH for future IPTV services.
Now Telefónica use Movistar+ in IPTV and Satellite.

Internet services 
Available streaming service providers include Netflix, Amazon Prime Video, HBO España, Movistar+ Lite, DAZN, FlixOlé, Filmin, Rakuten TV or Disney+. Atresmedia and Mediaset España launched their own pay services: Atresplayer Premium and Mitele Plus, respectively, which are upgraded versions of their freely available services  and  offering exclusive content on-demand. Free streaming services also include RTVE's RTVE Play and Pluto TV.

Programming 

Fiction
During the more than three decades of TVE's monopoly over TV broadcasting, TVE delivered a diverse fiction offer, both in terms of dramas and comedies as well as different production standards, although there was no special interest in an extended run of their series, and many of them simply often fit a prototypical one season & 13 episode profile. TVE also imported fiction series from the United States.

During the 1960s and 1970s, the scope of domestic fiction focused on theatrical and literary adaptations as well as region-themed fiction; in the particular case of comedy, productions underpinned the sense of costumbrismo and everyday life.

By the early 1990s, in the context of the entry of the private channels, domestically-produced comedy fiction series seized on the prime time slot, until then a dominion of game shows, foreign series and domestic dramas. A tendency to lengthen the duration of the episodes of comedy series manifested in this transitional period.

After its kickstart in 2018, Turkish soap operas had become popular in Spain by 2021. Also in the 2020s, low-budget "uplifting" German films had become a staple of the sobremesa timeslot on weekends (on TVE and Antena 3). Driven by appeals to nostalgia, 2021 saw a number of projects remaking or reviving former Spanish fiction series.

See also
 List of Spanish-language television channels
 List of Catalan-language television channels
 Media of Spain
 Internet in Spain
 Radio in Spain
 Newspapers in Spain

References 
Citations

Bibliography

External links
 List of TV channels available in Spain per platform